Hask (in Armenian Հասկ) is a Lebanese-Armenian publication published by the Armenian Catholicosate of the Great House of Cilicia  in Lebanon and the official organ of the Armenian Apostolic Church - (Holy See of Cilicia) worldwide.

Hask was established in January 1932 by Coadjutor-Catholicos Papken I. Hask means "ear of corn" in Armenian language. Papken I wrote the following in its first editorial: "The ear of corn symbolizes the Kingdom of God. Hask will become a monthly publication reporting the activities of our Catholicosate and its Dioceses. It will grant the opportunity to our faithful to receive authentic and regular information from the source. Also, it will include religious, literary and other subjects."

Hask covers the official activities of the Catholicosate and its Dioceses, and publishes encyclicals, official statements, sermons and religious and literary articles. The current editor is Very Reverend Father Krikor Chiftjian.

Licensed as a monthly publication, Hask religious Armenian-Apostolic (Orthodox) publication is now published with varying frequencies (monthly, bi-monthly, quarterly) as a small-size periodical.

References

External links
Hask periodical in pdf.

1932 establishments in Lebanon
Armenian-language magazines
Armenian-language mass media in Lebanon
Irregularly published magazines
Magazines established in 1932
Magazines published in Beirut
Monthly magazines published in Lebanon
Christian magazines